Jesus "Jesse" Valdez (born December 7, 1947) is a retired boxer. He was selected a member of the All-American AAU boxing team for 1973, and was named the top welterweight amateur boxer in the nation in 1973 by the National AAU Boxing Committee.

Amateur career
At sixteen years-old, Valdez won the National AAU Welterweight Championship in 1964 by upsetting Olympic bronze medalist Quincey Daniels. That same year, he qualified for the U.S. Olympic team as an alternate. In 1967, he won a bronze medal at the Pan-American Games. Valdez also won the National AAU Light Middleweight Championship in 1970, while boxing out of the Air Force. In 1967 he was the National Golden Gloves Light middleweight champion and in 1972 he was the National Golden Gloves Welterweight Champion. The Jesse Valdez Fan club was started by Rudy Ramirez.

In 1972, Valdez, who is of Mexican-American descent, qualified for the U.S. national team by defeating future world light-heavyweight champion Eddie Mustafa Muhammad. At the, 1972 Munich Olympic games, Valdez was eliminated from the finals by eventual gold medalist Emilio Correa in a disputed split decision. Valdez would go on to win a bronze medal.

1972 Olympic results 
Below is the record of Jesse Valdez, an American welterweight boxer who competed at the 1972 Munich Olympics:

Round of 64: Defeated Kolman Kalipe (Togo) by unanimous decision, 5–0
Round of 32: Defeated Carlos Burga (Peru) by majority decision, 4–1
Round of 16: Defeated David Jackson (Uganda) by majority decision, 4–1
Quarterfinal: Defeated Anatoly Khohlov (Soviet Union) by unanimous decision, 5–0
Semifinal: Lost to Emilio Correa (Cuba) by split decision, 2–3 (was awarded bronze medal)

Pro
Valdez never turned pro after his impressive amateur career but remained in the Air Force as a career military man.

References

External links
 Jesse Valdez at BoxRec
 

1947 births
Living people
Boxers at the 1972 Summer Olympics
American boxers of Mexican descent
Winners of the United States Championship for amateur boxers
National Golden Gloves champions
American male boxers
Medalists at the 1972 Summer Olympics
Olympic bronze medalists for the United States in boxing
Boxers at the 1967 Pan American Games
Pan American Games bronze medalists for the United States
Pan American Games medalists in boxing
Welterweight boxers
Medalists at the 1967 Pan American Games